WBYO (88.9 FM) is a radio station licensed to Sellersville, Pennsylvania, United States, and serves the Philadelphia area.  The station also serves as the flagship station for "Word FM", a network of Contemporary Christian radio stations in eastern and South Central Pennsylvania.  The station is currently owned by Four Rivers Community Broadcasting Corporation. In 2009, Word FM switched from contemporary Christian hit radio to Christian adult contemporary.

Stations

Notes:

Translators
In addition to the main station, WBYO and its simulcasted stations are relayed by additional translators to widen its broadcast area.

 For the translators of WLHI, see 
 For the translators of WPAZ, see

References

External links
 

BYO
Radio stations established in 1993
1993 establishments in Pennsylvania
BYO
Contemporary Christian radio stations in the United States